This article lists the governors of national banks of Serbia and Yugoslavia.

List

See also

 National Bank of Serbia
 Ministry of Finance (Yugoslavia)
 Ministry of Finance (Serbia)

References

External links
 National Bank of Serbia

Serbia and Yugoslavia

National bank
National bank
Governors of national banks of Serbia and Yugoslavia